Beacon Mill  is a Grade II listed smock mill in Benenden, Kent, England which is in need of restoration.  The mill has been out of use since 1923 and is privately owned.

History

Beacon Mill is one of two windmills marked on the 1819-43 Ordnance Survey map. It was also marked on Greenwood's 1821 map. Towards the end of the nineteenth century, Beacon Mill was run in conjunction with Wandle Mill, on the River Rother. The mill was last worked for trade in 1921 and the sails and fantail were removed in 1923. Two of the sails were re-erected on the White Mill at Headcorn. The other pair were intended for re-use on the Union Mill, Cranbrook but proved unsuitable for that mill. A pair of  diameter millstones from the mill were installed in the Union Mill at Cranbrook. Some repairs were carried out to the mill in 1950 to make it waterproof. On 3 December 1977 the cap suffered damage in a storm, and most of the roof was subsequently removed. The remains of the cap, and the windshaft had been removed by 1981. The mill was clad in plywood in the early 1980s in an effort to keep the weather out. It retains the plywood cladding today.

Description

Beacon Mill has a three-storey smock on a two-storey brick base. It had four single Patent sails mounted on a cast-iron windshaft and was winded by a fantail. There was a wide wooden stage at first-floor level. The Brake Wheel was  diameter, driving a  diameter Wallower. The Brake Wheel was wood, as is the Wallower and Upright Shaft. whilst the Great Spur Wheel is cast iron with wooden cogs.

Millers

William Oxley
Richard Reeves 1839-47
John Barton
Richard Corke
F Richardson
Thomas Collins Sr. - 1884
Thomas Collins Jr. 1884 - 99 
Robert Burgess 1899 - 1921

References

External links
Windmill World page on the mill.

Buildings and structures completed in the 19th century
Windmills in Kent
Grinding mills in the United Kingdom
Smock mills in England
Grade II listed buildings in Kent
Octagonal buildings in the United Kingdom